Pseudischnocampa diluta is a moth in the family Erebidae. It was described by Hervé de Toulgoët in 1986. It is found in Peru.

References

Moths described in 1986
Phaegopterina